Truman Reeves (August 17, 1840 – March 8, 1924) was California State Treasurer from 1899 to 1907.  He also was a member of the California State Assembly from 1883 to 1887 and treasurer of San Bernardino County (1890–98). He was a Republican.

Biography
Reeves was born in Chardon, Ohio.  He became a watchmaker's apprentice at age 18, and enlisted in the Union Army in 1861.  He was promoted from private to lieutenant, and was wounded three times—the last at the Battle of Cold Harbor in 1864, where he lost his left arm.  After the war, he was postmaster of Orwell, Ohio until 1868, and was then elected recorder of Ashtabula County, Ohio. In 1867 he married Marion E. McConkey (1845–1930), with whom he raised two children. They moved to San Bernardino, California in 1875, where Reeves worked as a watchmaker and fruit grower. He died in 1924 and his grave is at the East Lawn Memorial Park in Sacramento, California.

References

Biography
another biography

1840 births
1924 deaths
Members of the California State Assembly
Union Army officers
State treasurers of California
Politicians from Ashtabula, Ohio
People from Chardon, Ohio
Ohio Republicans
California Republicans
People from Orwell, Ohio
People from San Bernardino, California
19th-century American politicians
Military personnel from California